Zhang Qiang may refer to:

Zhang Qiang (singer) (born 1967), Chinese singer
Zhang Qiang (curler) (born 1979), Chinese wheelchair curler
Zhang Qiang (footballer) (born 1986), Chinese 5-a-side footballer
Zhang Qiang (official), on Beijing's COVID-19 prevention team
Zhang Qiang (table tennis), a table tennis player who plays in the doubles with Wang Xiaotong